Esezi Otomewo (born March 9, 1999) is an American football defensive end for the Minnesota Vikings of the National Football League (NFL). He played college football at Minnesota.

Professional career
Otomewo was selected by the Minnesota Vikings in the fifth round, 165th overall, of the 2022 NFL Draft.

References

External links
 Minnesota Vikings bio
 Minnesota Golden Gophers bio

1999 births
Living people
American football defensive ends
American sportspeople of Nigerian descent
Minnesota Golden Gophers football players
Minnesota Vikings players